The 2015–16 Ukrainian First League was the 25th since its establishment. The competition commenced on 26 July 2015 with eight matches. The competition had a winter break which began after Round 18 on November 22. The competition resumed on 26 March 2016 and completed on 1 June 2016.

Teams

The number of teams for the competition was confirmed on 19 June 2015.

Promoted teams
Two teams were promoted from the 2014–15 Ukrainian Second League.

 Cherkaskyi Dnipro – champion (returning as a successor of FC Dnipro Cherkasy that last participated in the 2007–08 Ukrainian First League, 17 seasons absence)
 Obolon-Brovar Kyiv – 2nd place runner-up (returning as a successor of FC Obolon Kyiv after an absence of three seasons)

Relegated teams 
One team was promoted from the 2014–15 Ukrainian Premier League.
 Illichivets Mariupol – 14th place (returning after an absence of seven seasons)

Reinstated teams 

 Avanhard Kramatorsk – special case (returning after an absence of one season)

Location map 
The following displays the location of teams.

Stadiums 

The following stadiums are considered home grounds for the teams in the competition.

Managers

Managerial changes

League table

Results

Position by round

Top goalscorers

See also
 2015–16 Ukrainian Premier League
 2015–16 Ukrainian Second League
 2015–16 Ukrainian Cup

References

Ukrainian First League seasons
2015–16 in Ukrainian association football leagues
Ukraine